Hollis is a town in Hillsborough County, New Hampshire, United States. The population was 8,342 at the 2020 census, growing 9% from the 2010 population of 7,684. The town center village is listed on the National Register of Historic Places as Hollis Village Historic District.

History

Town name 
According to Samuel T. Worcester's history which was commissioned by the town selectmen in 1878, the town was incorporated in the province of New Hampshire on April 3, 1746, "to have continence forever by the name of Holles..."

Worcester argues that, at the time of the charter, Governor Benning Wentworth was indebted to Thomas Pelham-Holles, 1st Duke of Newcastle, for his appointment as governor. According to Worcester, it was "very much the custom with Gov. Wentworth" to name towns in honor of his friends and patrons. Thus in the same year, the towns of Pelham and Holles were incorporated, and named after the duke. Worcester cites a Mr. Bancroft who,

 "...in his history, says of him (Newcastle) that he was of so feeble a head, and so treacherous a heart that Sir Robert Walpole called his name 'Perfidy'; that Lord Halifax used to revile him as a knave and fool, and that he was so ignorant of this continent, that it was said of him, that he addressed his letters to the 'Island of New England.'"

Thomas Hollis (1659–1731) was a major benefactor of Harvard College. According to Worcester, about the year 1775, town records started appearing with the town's name spelled as "Hollis", after Thomas Hollis. Both spellings were used until about 1815, after which only the name "Hollis" appears, "...while Holles, the name of the Duke of Newcastle, has passed into merited oblivion."

First settlers 

Captain Peter Powers (1707–1757), his wife Anna Keyes (1708–1798), and their two children Peter (1729–1800) and Stephen (born 1729) were the first settlers of Hollis, in 1731. In 1732, the Powers birthed the first child in Hollis, a daughter, also named Anna. Powers was also a militia officer in the French and Indian Wars and was commissioned captain by Governor Wentworth.

The younger Peter was the first college graduate from Hollis, matriculating from Harvard in 1754. He served as pastor of churches throughout New England and died at the age of 71 in Deer Island, Maine.

Notable events 
 From its charter in 1746 until about 1763, Hollis was engaged in a running border dispute with Dunstable (now Nashua, New Hampshire) over a small settlement at "One Pine Hill", near Flint Pond. The General Court eventually resolved the dispute in favor of Hollis.
 In 1769, a strip one and a quarter miles wide on the western border of Hollis was incorporated into the new town of Raby. In 1785, the General Court granted a petition of Raby to annex an additional three-quarters of a mile of the western Hollis border. In 1796, the name of Raby was changed to Brookline
 In 1770, by act of the General Court, Hollis annexed a portion of the town of Monson when its charter was repealed by its own request.
 In 1773, Hollis acquired some  more land from Dunstable in a dispute over the building and upkeep of a bridge over the Nashua River.

Notable facts 
The following is from Worcester's History of Hollis:
 When Hollis was incorporated, the town tax list comprised 54 families.
 By 1760, that number had risen to over 105 families.
 In 1767, two of the 384 slaves in New Hampshire resided in Hollis. In 1775, four of the 656 slaves in New Hampshire resided in Hollis.
 The first trial for murder in Hillsborough County was of Israel Wilkins Jr, of Hollis, for the murder of his father, Israel Wilkins Sr., on November 2, 1772. The elder Wilkins died of "a blow upon the head...of the length three inches and the depth of one inch." Wilkins Jr. was found guilty of man-slaughter, pleaded benefit of clergy, and was subsequently branded upon the thumb with the letter "T", and forced to forfeit all his goods to the King.
 Two-thirds of the grantees of the charter for the town of Plymouth, New Hampshire, were from Hollis, causing Worcester to refer to it as "A Hollis Colony".
 Eight Hollis residents were killed at the Battle of Bunker Hill.
 125 Hollis men were in the army in whole or in part during the year 1776, approximately one tenth of the population.
 22 Hollis men died while in the army during the Revolutionary War.
 In 1820, Hollis had five grain mills, six saw mills, one clothing mill, two taverns and four stores. By 1878, it had one grain mill, no saw or clothing mills, no taverns, and one store.

Railroad 
Hollis was a station stop on the Worcester & Nashua Railroad, who built their line through town in 1848 as part of a through route between Worcester, Massachusetts and Portland, Maine. The line was later acquired in 1886 by the Boston & Maine Railroad. The WN&P from Hollis to Nashua, New Hampshire was abandoned in 1941, and the B&M subsequently renamed the remaining line south to Ayer, Massachusetts the Hollis Branch. The B&M continued to provide freight service until the Hollis Branch was abandoned in 1982, with a fuel dealer being the last rail customer in town.

Geography 

The Nashua River flows through the southeast corner of the town out of Pepperell, Massachusetts and into Nashua. The Nissitissit River, a tributary of the Nashua, flows through the western part of the town. Pennichuck Brook rises near the center of town, north of Silver Lake, and drains the northern part of the town along with its tributary, Witches Brook. Pennichuck Brook and the Nashua River are tributaries of the Merrimack River, and Hollis lies fully within the Merrimack's watershed.

Adjacent municipalities 
 Amherst, New Hampshire (north)
 Merrimack, New Hampshire (northeast)
 Nashua, New Hampshire (east)
 Pepperell, Massachusetts (south)
 Brookline, New Hampshire (west)
 Milford, New Hampshire (northwest)

Climate 
Hollis is in USDA plant hardiness zone 5A. The closest NOAA climate station is in Nashua. The nearby table shows applicable temperature and precipitation data by month.

Demographics 

As with many of the towns on the New Hampshire border with Massachusetts, Hollis is rapidly changing from mixed-use farmland (apple orchards, corn, pumpkins, and other vegetables) to a bedroom community for the 54% of working residents who work elsewhere in New Hampshire, and the 30% who work out of state.

As of the census of 2000, there were 7,015 people, 2,440 households, and 2,025 families residing in the town. The population density was 221.0 people per square mile (85.3/km2). There were 2,491 housing units at an average density of 78.5 per square mile (30.3/km2). The racial makeup of the town was 96.59% White, 0.44% African American, 0.11% Native American, 1.65% Asian, 0.01% Pacific Islander, 0.17% from other races, and 1.01% from two or more races. Hispanic or Latino of any race were 0.93% of the population.

There were 2,440 households, out of which 42.0% had children under the age of 18 living with them, 74.9% were married couples living together, 5.8% had a female householder with no husband present, and 17.0% were non-families. 13.4% of all households were made up of individuals, and 4.8% had someone living alone who was 65 years of age or older. The average household size was 2.88 and the average family size was 3.16.

In the town, the population was spread out, with 29.6% under the age of 18, 3.8% from 18 to 24, 28.5% from 25 to 44, 29.8% from 45 to 64, and 8.3% who were 65 years of age or older. The median age was 40 years. For every 100 females, there were 99.0 males. For every 100 females age 18 and over, there were 98.0 males.

For the period 2014–2018, the median income for a household in the town was $132,500, and the median income for a family was $148,820. Males had a median income of $112,692 versus $73,971 for females. The per capita income for the town was $62,329. About 1.2% of the population were below the poverty line.

Historical population change 

The table to the right and nearby chart, taken primarily from historical data from the U.S. Census Bureau, shows the population of Hollis from 1767 through 2010.

After nearly doubling in population over the last 33 years of the 18th century, Hollis' population consistently declined (excepting only the decade of the 1850s and the first decade of the 20th century) for 120 years, not returning to the levels of 1800 until sometime during the 1950s. Since 1930, Hollis' population has consistently grown, particularly during the 1950s, 1960s, and 1970s.

Culture 
Hollis has a number of town traditions and celebrations characteristic of old New England towns, including two harvest festivals and the annual celebration "Old Home Days."

Old Home Days 
Hollis Old Home Days is "an annual weekend celebration of the days of 'Hollis Past'." "Old Home Days" were originally established in New Hampshire in 1899, by then Governor Frank West Rollins, in an attempt to draw people back to New Hampshire towns. Hollis Old Home Days was reestablished in 1996 in commemoration of the town's 250th anniversary. The 2010 event included "amusement rides, parade, barbecue, silent auction, booths, fireworks, live music, balloon rides, pet parade, heritage craft demonstrations" and various other activities. It is generally held over the second weekend in September at Nichols Field in downtown Hollis.

Hollis Strawberry Festival 
The annual Strawberry Festival each June comprises a concert by the town band accompanied by a variety of strawberry-based treats for sale including strawberry shortcake, pie and ice cream made from locally grown strawberries.

Hollis Apple Festival 
The Hollis Apple Festival is held each year in October and includes a concert by the Hollis Town Band. The festival previously included the Applefest Half Marathon, first run in 1983. In 2008, it was named "Race of the Year" by New England Runner. The Applefest was co-hosted by the Hollis Women's Club.

Government 
As of 2010, Hollis was part of the following state and federal legislative and executive districts:

Transportation 
There are four New Hampshire State Routes within Hollis.

NH 111 cross the extreme southeastern corner of the town, connecting to Pepperell, Massachusetts, in the south and Nashua in the east. It is known locally as Runnells Bridge Road.
NH 111A starts at NH 111 and goes east into Nashua. It is known locally as Groton Road.
NH 122 is the main north-south route, running through the town center and connecting to Pepperell, Massachusetts, in the south and Amherst in the north. It is known locally as Pepperell Road, Main Street, and Silver Lake Road.
NH 130 is the main east-west route, running through the town center and connecting to Brookline in the west and Nashua in the east. It is known locally as Proctor Hill Road, Ash Street, and Broad Street.

Education 

There are four schools in Hollis, two of which are part of the Hollis/Brookline Cooperative School District. Hollis Primary School serves kindergarten through third grade, and Hollis Upper Elementary School serves grades four through six. Hollis/Brookline Middle School serves seventh and eighth grade and Hollis/Brookline High School serves grades nine through twelve. For many years, the current primary school was known as Hollis Elementary School and served kindergarten through grade six. The current Middle School (known as Hollis/Brookline Junior High School until 2001) was formerly Hollis/Brookline High School but proved far too small for the number of students attending. A new building was built and became the Hollis/Brookline Junior High School. However, the three buildings were still insufficient, and a new high school was opened in 1998. The former high school became the current middle school, the former middle school became Hollis Upper Elementary, and the former Hollis Elementary became Hollis Primary. Recently, with the finishing of the newly constructed Montessori building, a new method of education has opened with the school.

The historic Farley Building (formerly known as simply the "White Building") is the original Hollis High School built in 1877 and continued to be used as a school building through the 2005–2006 school year. During this last year for the Farley Building, it contained classrooms for English, social studies, art, French, and Spanish. The Town of Hollis acquired the Farley Building from the Hollis School District in August, 2007.

Notable people 
 Ludwig Ahgren (born 1995), YouTube streamer
 Mary A. Blood (1851–1927), co-founder and first president of Columbia School of Oratory in Chicago
 Russell Findlay (born 1965), first Chief Marketing Officer of Major League Soccer, grew up in Hollis
 Frank Merrill (1903–1955), remembered for his command of Merrill's Marauders, officially the 5307th Composite Unit (provisional), in the Burma Campaign of World War II
 Pete Palmer (born 1938), sports statistician and encyclopedia editor
 Endicott Peabody (1920–1997), former Massachusetts governor, spent his final years in Hollis after retiring from politics
 Warren Rudman (1930–2012), former US senator from New Hampshire, also lived in Hollis after retirement from politics
 Henry Aiken Worcester (1802–1841), 19th century Yale University alumni, Swedenborgian minister, and proponent of vegetarianism

References

External links 
 
 Hollis Historical Society
 New Hampshire Economic and Labor Market Information Bureau Profile
 SAU 41, Hollis Brookline Cooperative School District

 
Towns in Hillsborough County, New Hampshire
Populated places established in 1746
Towns in New Hampshire
1746 establishments in New Hampshire